John W. Rhoden (March 13, 1918 - January 4, 2001) was an American sculptor from Birmingham, Alabama.  Rhoden moved to New York in 1938, where he began studying with Richmond Barthé. Rhoden worked in wood and bronze, and created a number of commissioned works including Untitled (Family) at Harlem Hospital Center;  Mitochondria at Bellevue Hospital Center in Manhattan; Curved Wal at the African American Museum in Philadelphia; Zodiacal Structure at the Sheraton Hotel in Philadelphia; and a sculpture of Frederick Douglass at Lincoln University.

Life 
Rhoden served in World War II, studied at the School of Painting and Sculpture at Columbia University, and was named a Fulbright Fellow in 1951. He won a Rome Prize Fellowship from the American Academy in Rome in 1952. In 1956, he was a member of an artists delegation that visited the Soviet Union, Poland and Yugoslavia under a grant from the Rockefeller Foundation.

After his time traveling with the State Department, the Rhodens returned to New York City in 1960. Shortly thereafter, John Rhoden left for Indonesia on a Rockefeller Foundation Grant to set up a bronze foundry at the Institut Teknologi in Bandung from 1961 through 1963.

His works have been displayed in the Metropolitan Museum of Art, the Pennsylvania Academy of the Fine Arts, the Art Institute of Chicago, and the Boston Museum of Fine Arts. At Columbia University, he studied under William Zorach, Oronzio Maldarelli and Hugo Robus.

References
Notes

Further reading
 Appelhof, Ruth Ann. Sculpture by John Rhoden. Birmingham Museum of Art, 1984. ISBN B00071Z3B8
 "Frederick Douglass Statue Unveiled At Lincoln Univ." "Jet Magazine", November 20, 1989.

External links
- biography of John Rhoden on BhamWiki.com
- Rhoden sculpture at Harlem Hospital Center from the New York City Health and Hospitals Corporation "Art Collection" webpage
- Rhoden sculpture at Bellevue Hospital Center from the New York City Health and Hospitals Corporation "Art Collection" webpage
- "John W. Rhoden 1918-2001" on AskART.com

2001 deaths
1910s births
Columbia University alumni
African-American sculptors
20th-century American sculptors
20th-century American male artists
American male sculptors
20th-century African-American artists